An anal fissure is a break or tear in the skin of the anal canal. Anal fissures may be noticed by bright red anal bleeding on toilet paper and undergarments, or sometimes in the toilet. If acute they are painful after defecation, but with chronic fissures, pain intensity often reduces. Anal fissures usually extend from the anal opening and are usually located posteriorly in the midline, probably because of the relatively unsupported nature and poor perfusion of the anal wall in that location. Fissure depth may be superficial or sometimes down to the underlying sphincter muscle. Untreated fissures develop a hood-like skin tag (sentinel piles) which cover the fissure and cause discomfort and pain.

Causes 

Most anal fissures are caused by stretching of the anal mucous membrane beyond its capability.

Superficial or shallow anal fissures look much like a paper cut, and may be hard to detect upon visual inspection; they will generally self-heal within a couple of weeks. However, some anal fissures become chronic and deep and will not heal. The most common cause of non-healing is spasming of the internal anal sphincter muscle which results in impaired blood supply to the anal mucosa. The result is a non-healing ulcer, which may become infected by fecal bacteria.
In adults, fissures may be caused by constipation, the passing of large, hard stools, or by prolonged diarrhea. In older adults, anal fissures may be caused by decreased blood flow to the area. When fissures are found laterally, tuberculosis, occult abscesses, leukemic infiltrates, carcinoma, acquired immunodeficiency syndrome (AIDS) or inflammatory bowel disease should be considered as causes. Some sexually transmitted infections can promote the breakdown of tissue resulting in a fissure. Examples of sexually transmitted infections that may affect the anorectal area are syphilis, herpes, chlamydia and human papilloma virus.

Other common causes of anal fissures include:
 childbirth trauma in women
 anal sex
 Crohn's disease
 ulcerative colitis
 poor toileting in young children.

Diagnosing 

External anal fissures on the anal verge can be diagnosed by visual inspection.

Internal anal fissures in adults on anterior side, posterior side or within any part of the inner circumference of the anal sphincter muscle can be diagnosed with beak proctoscope 23mm diameter, Chelsea Eaton anal speculum 23mm diameter, Park anal retractor or by digital rectal examination with a finger inside the anal sphincter muscle. Narrow anal fissures might not be felt by finger during rectal examination due to the glove.

Note that colonoscopy, sigmoidoscopy, or normal proctoscopy is for diagnosing internal hemorrhoids and other internal rectal diseases and not for diagnosing anal fissures.

Prevention 

For adults, the following may help prevent anal fissures:
 Avoiding straining when defecating. This includes treating and preventing constipation by eating food rich in dietary fiber, drinking enough water, occasional use of a stool softener, and avoiding constipating agents. Similarly, prompt treatment of diarrhea may reduce anal strain.
 Careful anal hygiene after defecation, including using soft toilet paper and cleaning with water, plus the use of sanitary wipes.
 In cases of pre-existing or suspected fissure, use of a lubricating ointment (It is important to note that hemorrhoid ointment is contraindicated because it constricts small blood vessels, thus causes a decrease in blood flow, which prevents healing).

In infants, frequent diaper change can prevent anal fissure. As constipation can be a cause, making sure the infant is drinking enough fluids (i.e. breastmilk, proper ratios when mixing formulas) is beneficial. In infants, once an anal fissure has occurred, addressing underlying causes is usually enough to ensure healing occurs.

Treatment 
Non-surgical treatments are recommended initially for acute and chronic anal fissures. These include topical nitroglycerin or calcium channel blockers (e.g. diltiazem), or injection of botulinum toxin into the anal sphincter.

Other measures include warm sitz baths, topical anesthetics, high-fiber diet and stool softeners.

Medication 

Local application of medication to relax the sphincter muscle, thus allowing the healing to proceed, was first proposed in 1994 with nitroglycerine ointment,
and then calcium channel blockers in 1999 with nifedipine ointment,
and the following year with topical diltiazem.
Branded preparations are now available of topical nitroglycerine ointment (Rectogesic (Rectiv) as 0.2% in Australia and 0.4% in UK and US), topical nifedipine 0.3% with lidocaine 1.5% ointment (Antrolin in Italy since April 2004) and diltiazem 2% (Anoheal in UK, although still in Phase III development). A common side effect drawback of nitroglycerine ointment is headache, caused by systemic absorption of the drug, which limits patient acceptability.

A combined surgical and pharmacological treatment, administered by colorectal surgeons, is the direct injection of botulinum toxin (Botox) into the anal sphincter to relax it. This treatment was first investigated in 1993. However, in many cases involving Botox injections, the patients eventually had to choose another cure as the injections proved less and less potent, spending thousands of dollars in the meantime for a partial cure. Lateral sphincterotomy is the Gold Standard for curing this condition.
Combination of medical therapies may offer up to 98% cure rates.

Surgery 

Surgical procedures are generally reserved for people with anal fissure who have tried medical therapy for at least one to three months and have not healed. It is not the first option in treatment.

The main concern with surgery is the development of anal incontinence. Anal incontinence can include the inability to control gas, mild fecal soiling, or loss of solid stool. Some degree of incontinence can occur in up to 45 percent of patients in the immediate surgical recovery period. However, incontinence is rarely permanent and is usually mild. The risk should be discussed with one's surgeon.

Surgical treatment, under general anaesthesia, was either anal stretch (Lord's operation) or lateral sphincterotomy where the internal anal sphincter muscle is incised. Both operations aim to decrease sphincter spasming and thereby restore normal blood supply to the anal mucosa. Surgical operations involve a general or regional anaesthesia. Anal stretch is also associated with anal incontinence in a small proportion of cases and thus sphincterotomy is the operation of choice.

Lateral internal sphincterotomy 

Lateral internal sphincterotomy (LIS) is the surgical procedure of choice for anal fissures due to its simplicity and its high success rate (~95%). In this procedure the internal anal sphincter is partially divided in order to reduce spasming and thus improve the blood supply to the perianal area. This improvement in the blood supply helps to heal the fissure, and the weakening of the sphincter is also believed to reduce the potential for recurrence. The procedure is generally performed as a day surgery after the patient is given general anesthesia. The pain from the sphincterotomy is usually mild and is often less than the pain of the fissure itself. Patients often return to normal activity within one week.

LIS does, however, have a number of potential side effects including problems with incision site healing and incontinence to flatus and faeces (some surveys of surgical results suggest incontinence rates of up to 36%).

Though lateral internal sphincterotomy (LIS) is considered safe on a short-term basis, there are concerns about its long-term safety. Pankaj Garg et al. published a systematic review and meta-analysis in which they analyzed the long-term continence disturbance two years after the LIS procedure. They found the incidence of long-term continence disturbance to be 14%, so caution and careful patient selection are needed before undergoing LIS.

Anal dilation 

Anal dilation, or stretching of the anal canal (Lord's operation), has fallen out of favour in recent years, primarily due to the unacceptably high incidence of fecal incontinence. In addition, anal stretching can increase the rate of flatus incontinence. The incidence of incontinence is thought to be due to a lack of standardization and that proper technique results in little chance that it will occur.

In the early 1990s, however, a repeatable method of anal dilation proved to be very effective and showed a very low incidence of side effects. Since then, at least one other controlled, randomized study has shown there to be little difference in healing rates and complications between controlled anal dilation and LIS, while another has again shown high success rates with anal dilation coupled with low incidence of side effects.

Fissurectomy 

Fissurectomy involves excision of the skin on and around the anal fissure and excision of the sentinel pile if one is present. The surgical wound can be left open. New skin tissue grows and it heals.

Epidemiology 
The incidence of anal fissures is around 1 in 350 adults. They occur equally common in men and women and most often occur in adults aged 15 to 40.

See also 

 Anal fistula
 Hemorrhoid
 Pruritus ani

References

External links 

Diseases of intestines